Heinz Emigholz (born 22 January 1948 in Achim, near Bremen, Germany) is a filmmaker, actor, artist, writer and producer. He lives and works in Berlin and Malta. Emigholz has produced a comprehensive filmic and artistic oeuvre and has also done performance art and acted in other directors’ films (Cynthia Beatt, Silke Grossmann, Stefan Hayn, Birgit and Wilhelm Hein, Ken Jacobs, Sheila McLaughlin, Sandra Nettelbeck, Elfi Mikesch, Lior Shamriz, Joseph Vilsmaier, Klaus Wyborny a.o.).

Career 
Emigholz has been trained as an illustrator and a retoucher. He has studied philosophy and literary studies at the university in Hamburg. In 1968 he started to work with the medium film. Since 1973 Emigholz is working independently as a self-employed artist in the USA and in Germany. In 1978 he founded the film company Pym Films.

Between 1993-2013 he was Professor for Experimental film at Berlin University of the Arts, where he founded the Institute for Time Based Media. Since 2010 he is Professor for film at European Graduate School in Saas-Fee, Switzerland. Since 2012 Emigholz is a member of Akademie der Künste Berlin in the section Visual Arts.

Films
Emigholz’s first films, dating back to the early 1970s and the context of avant-garde and Experimental film, display "a complex interaction between abstract temporal compositions – or filmic movements, respectively – and selected urban and natural landscapes" (Emigholz).

In Demon (1976/77), he began to examine words. The film explores the prose poem "Le Démon de l’Analogie" (The Demon of Analogy) by Stéphane Mallarmé. "Just as previous films were cut so that fixed features of the landscape and their connections met with a score, in this film, there is one shot for each word." (Frieda Grafe) Emigholz included narrative and scenic elements in Normalsatz / Ordinary Sentence (1978–81) and his subsequent films.

His visual composition and framing, which establishes a phenomenological relationship to space, is described as striking, as it ignores the conventional perpendicularity and the central perspective: "The visual space is always populated in the films rather than being empty space whose coordinates are fixed to categories borrowed from abstract geometry, such as the horizon and the vanishing point. Where there is a space, there is also a body that defines it, even if it be via its negative form, absence." (Ronald Balczuweit) This type of construction of space remains defining for his series Photography and beyond, a "collection of films that can be combined freely and that deal with products designed by humans – architecture, drawings, writings, sculpture" (Emigholz). The series was established in 1993 and drew on previous work from the 1970s and 1980s. The films of the subseries Architecture as Autobiography show the extant buildings by architects, civil engineers and designers such as Bruce Goff, Adolf Loos, Robert Maillart, Rudolph Schindler, Louis Sullivan and others in chronological order.

About film Emigholz states: "As a technical medium, film projects the spaces of memory themselves rather than presenting them solely by means of a mental trick. The media of writing, drawing, photography, film, electronic imagery and computing have shifted the complex art of recollection into a readily-available array of technically -generated storage systems. The ancient art of the rhetorician is still present, albeit in rudimentary form, in the memorizing of text by actors and speakers.

Art
In New York in 1974, Emigholz began to work on Die Basis des Make-Up/The Basis of Make-Up, a series which grew to more than 600 drawings by 2008. The title goes back to the caption of a photo showing a skull in a makeup textbook from the 1930s. All the drawings were in black and white and were published as photographic prints in the format 54 x 64 cm. Like many of his films, they were developed from the artist’s notebooks which he uses to record sketches of his own texts and to paste various specimens of civilization garbage, sentences overheard on the street or on television, advertising, diagrams from military textbooks and much more. These bits and pieces were transformed in the drawings and films and were connected to one another in austere compositions, but their origins remained discernible. Narrative approaches emerge, yet they do not connect to a single narrative, but can still be combined freely. The "experience of the provisionality and relativity of all interpretations" (Hanne Loreck) is mirrored in this formal openness.

Filmography
Two Basilicas (Photography and beyond - Part 28; about the Cattedrale di Santa Maria Assunto, Orvieto and the Grundtvig's Church, Copenhagen), 2018, DCP, color, 36 min, conception (together with Thomas Bo Jensen), director, camera, editing
Dieste [Uruguay] (Photography and beyond – Part 27; about Eladio Dieste), 2015-2017, DCP, color, 95 min, director, script, camera, editing
Streetscapes [Dialogue] (Photography and beyond – Part 26), 2015-2017, DCP, color, 132 min, director, script, camera, editing
Bickels [Socialism] (Photography and beyond – Part 25; about ), 2015-2017, HDV, color, 92 min, director, camera, editing
2 + 2 = 22 [The Alphabet] (Photography and beyond – Part 24), 2013-2017, DCP, color, 88 min, director, script, camera, editing
Le Corbusier [IIIII] Asger Jorn [Relief] (about Le Corbusier's Villa Savoye and Asger Jorn's Grand Relief in the Aarhus Statsgymnasium), 2015, HDV, color, 29 min, director, script, camera editing
Two Museums (Photography and beyond – Part 22; about Renzo Piano's building for The Menil Collection in Houston, Texas, and Samuel Bickels' Museum of Art in Ein Harod, Israel), 2012/2014, DCP, color, 18 min, director, camera, editing
Five music videos for the band KREIDLER, 2012-2013, (together 55 min), director, camera, editing
The Airstrip (Decampment of Modernism – Part III, Photography and beyond – Part 21), 2016, DCP, color, 108 min, director, camera, editingParabeton – Pier Luigi Nervi and Roman Concrete (Decampment of Modernism – Part I / Photography and beyond – Part 19), 2012, DCP, color, 100 min., director, camera, editingA Series of Thoughts (Miscellanea V, VI, VII und IV), 1987-2011, HDV, color, 91 min., director, camera, editingZwei Projekte von Frederick Kiesler (Two Projects by Frederick Kiesler) 2006-2009, HDV, color, 16 min., director, camera, editingSense of Architecture (explores over 50 projects of contemporary Austrian architects), 2005-2009, HDV, color, 168 min., director, camera, editingLoos Ornamental (about Adolf Loos), 2008, 35 mm, color, 72 min., director, camera, editingSchindler's Houses (about the American work of Rudolph Schindler), 2006–2007, 35 mm, color, 99 min., co-producer, editing, director, script, camera Miscellanea III, 1997–2005, 35 mm, color, 22 min., director, editing, cameraThe Basis of Make-Up III, 1996–2005, 35 mm, color, 26 min., director, camera, editing, drawingsD’Annunzios Cave (a film about Gabriele d'Annunzio and his pretentious villa), 2002–2005, DigiBeta, color, 52 min., director, editingGoff in the Desert (explores 62 buildings by architect Bruce Goff), 2002-2003, 35 mm, color, 110 min., director, camera, editingMaillart's Bridges (explores the works of the bridge builder Robert Maillart), 1995-1999, 35 mm, color, 24 min., director, camera, editingSullivan's Banks (about Louis Sullivan's buildings for banks), 1993-1999, 35 mm, color, 38 min., director, camera, editingmammamia, 1997/98, by Sandra Nettelbeck, actorSchlafes Bruder, 1994/95,by Joseph Vilsmaier, actorStalingrad, 1991/92, by Joseph Vilsmaier, actorThe Holy Bunch, 1986–1990, 35 mm, black and white and color, 89 min., director, script, cameraDie Wiese der Sachen, 1974–1987, 16 mm, black and white and color, 88 min., director, script, camera, editing, lighting, actorHome Movies 1971 - 1981, 1985, actorThe Basis of Make-Up, 1979–1984, 16 mm, black and white and color, 84 min., director, script, camera, editingThe Basis of Make-Up I, 1974–1983, 35 mm, color, no sound, 30 min., director, script, drawings, note books, camera, editingExecution. A Study of Mary, 1979, narratorNormalsatz, 1978–1981, 16 mm, black and white and color, 105 min., director, camera, editing, script, actorBartleby, 1976, actorDemon. The Translation of "The Demon of Analogy" by Stéphane Mallarmé, 1976/77, 16 mm, black and white and color, 30 min., director, conceptual design, camera, editing, productionDer Ort der Handlung, 1976/1977, actorHotel, 1975/76, 16 mm, black and white, 27 min., director, conceptual design, camera, editing, productionStuhl, 1974/75, director, producer, camera, editing, scriptTide, 1974, 16 mm, black and white, no sound, 33 min., director, conceptual design, camera, editing, productionArrowplane, 1973/74, 16 mm, color, no sound, 24 min., director, conceptual design, camera, editing, productionSchenec-Tady III, 1972–1975, 16 mm black and white, no sound, 20 min., director, conceptual design, composition, camera, editing, productionSchenec-Tady II, 1973, 16 mm, color, no sound, 18 Min., director, conceptual design, composition, camera, editing, productionSchenec-Tady I, 1972/73, 16 mm, black and white, no sound, 27 min., director, conceptual design, composition, camera, editing, productionMorningglory-Fragments'', 1971, director, camera, editing, producer, script

References

External links 
Heinz Emigholz' official Website
Heinz Emigholz Faculty Page at European Graduate School. (Biography, bibliography and video lectures)
Heinz Emigholz - Catalogue of the German national library

Article in Der Standard
Viennale-Site with pictures and reviews
bilingual Website »Goff in the desert«
Website »D’Annunzio’s CAVE «
Website »Schindlers Häuser«
Website »Loos Ornamental«

1948 births
Living people
German male film actors
German documentary film directors
Mass media people from Lower Saxony
German experimental filmmakers
Academic staff of European Graduate School
Members of the Academy of Arts, Berlin